The Royal Canadian Legion is a non-profit Canadian ex-service organization (veterans' organization) founded in 1925.  Membership includes people who have served as military, Royal Canadian Mounted Police, provincial and municipal police, Royal Canadian Air, Army and Sea Cadets, direct relatives of members and also affiliated members. Membership is now also open to the general public.

History
In Canada, several veterans' organisations emerged during the First World War. The Great War Veterans Association was by 1919 the largest veterans' organisation in Canada. Following the First World War, 15 different organisations existed to aid returning veterans in Canada. Field Marshal The 1st Earl Haig, founder of the British Empire Service League (now known as the Royal Commonwealth Ex-Services League), visited Canada in 1925 and urged the organisations to merge. In the same year, the Dominion Veterans Alliance was created to unite these organizations.

In November 1925, the Canadian Legion was founded in Winnipeg, Manitoba, as the Canadian Legion of the British Empire Services League. The Canadian Legion of the British Empire Services League was incorporated by a special Act of Parliament the following year. The Legion grew steadily through the 1930s and then expanded rapidly following the Second World War.  In 1960, Queen Elizabeth II granted The Legion royal patronage and it became The Royal Canadian Legion.

Recognition
On 10 November 1975, Canada Post issued "The Royal Canadian Legion, 1925–1975" designed by Rudy Kovach. The 8¢ stamps are perforated 13 and were printed by British American Bank Note Company.

National Headquarters
The National Headquarters of The Royal Canadian Legion in Ottawa, Ontario, features a Wall of Remembrance. 
The Wall of Remembrance is adorned by an 11-ft long stainless steel sword (2006) by André Gauthier. 
The Royal Canadian Legion commissioned a small work of art on the theme of the Tomb of the Unknown Soldier (2001) by André Gauthier.
“Of Such as These” (2003) by André Gauthier is a small bas-relief of Canadian World War II fighting men and women presented by the Conference of Defence Associations Institute to The Royal Canadian Legion's National Secretariat in Ottawa.

Memorials
The Royal Canadian Legion Branch 593 erected a memorial in Ottawa dedicated to those who died in the First and Second World Wars and the Korean War.

Legion museums

A number of military museums are co-located and affiliated with Royal Canadian Legions.

Legion halls 

Most small towns and villages in Canada have at least one Legion Hall.  Often the Legion Hall is a major community centre, combining the functions of a pub, pool hall, dance hall, bingo hall, banquet hall, and so on.

Legion Halls are numbered, for example "Branch 99 Royal Canadian Legion". This is not a nationwide numbering system; instead, each provincial Command has its own numerical sequence. "Branch 99", therefore, can refer to any of several Legion Halls, as follows: Belleville, Ontario; Cowansville, Quebec; Lipton/Dysart, Saskatchewan; Coronation, Alberta (a branch that has closed); Sicamous, British Columbia; or Emo, Ontario (in the Manitoba/Northwestern Ontario Command).

The Royal Canadian Legion Maple Leaf Post-84 is located in Royal Oak, Michigan.

Services and activities

Poppy Campaign
The Poppy image is a powerful symbol and easily recognizable in Canada as being associated with loss, sacrifice and remembrance.  With the formation of the Legion in 1925 the Poppy was adopted as a national symbol of remembrance and the focal point of the Poppy Campaign. In 1948 the Government of Canada chose to award the trademark copyright of the Poppy to the Royal Canadian Legion - a move made to protect the image from misuse.  This trademark copyright remains in effect today restricting its usage to remembrance within Canada and under the authority of the Royal Canadian Legion.

The Legion is responsible for Canada's remembrance poppy campaign which distributes plastic lapel poppies to be worn in the lead up to Remembrance Day. The poppy is worn on the left lapel, or as close to the heart as possible.  The current lapel poppy has been manufactured since 1922—originally under the sponsorship of the Department of Soldiers Civil Re-establishment. Until 1996, the poppy material was manufactured at sheltered workshops operated by Veterans Affairs Canada. Poppies are distributed through retail outlets, workplaces, Legion branches, malls and other locations across Canada. Typically, the poppies are offered up for donation as a symbol of remembrance, using an honour system, with the poppies being left in open places with a receptacle for leaving a donation toward the campaign. Funds raised are used to support ex-service members in need  and to fund medical appliances and research, home services, care facilities and numerous other purposes benefiting veterans.

Memorial activities

Legion Athletic Camp
In 1962 the Legion began a summer sports camp at the International Peace Garden which ran until 2019. More than 60,000 school age athletes. Several sports were offered over a five-week period. The program was founded by George H. Phillips and Fred Taylor.

Legion Bands
There are many privately run Legion bands across the country, acting independently and in the community in which they are based. They are attached to different legion branches and include full concert show bands, and marching bands. The Royal Canadian Legion Concert Band in Toronto has been active for over a century and is one of the oldest legion bands in the country. Many legion bands are led by former bandsmen, most notably James Gayfer, the former director of the Band of the Canadian Guards from 1953 to 1961, who would later go on the found the Petawawa Legion Community Band in 1978. In May 1978, legion bands congregated at the Olympic Stadium in Montreal for the Legion Day celebrations, becoming one of the largest legion combined activities recorded.

Lest We Forget Project
The Legion supports the Lest We Forget Project in cooperation with the Canadian War Museum.

Legion Military Skills Conversion Program
In 2015, the Royal Canadian Legion donated $830,000 to the BCIT School of Business to fund the Legion Military Skills Conversion Program. This program helps Canadian veterans and reservists convert their military skills and knowledge into a business credential.

Appeals Before the Veterans Review and Appeal Board
The Royal Canadian Legion provides assistance to Veterans and eligible family members in Reviews and Appeals before the Veterans Review and Appeal Board. The RCL and the Bureau of Pensions Advocates often work together to prepare cases and represent Veteran clients before the Board when those clients wish to appeal disability pension and award decisions made by Veterans Affairs Canada.

Membership

Membership in The Royal Canadian Legion was originally restricted to ex-service members of Canada's Armed Forces and Merchant Navy. The organization is now open to members of the general public. There are four categories of membership.

Ordinary membership
Ordinary membership is open to anyone who has served or is serving in one of the following:
The Canadian Forces or His Majesty's Forces (including regular force or reserve force under class "C" service, CIC, or other reserve).
Forces or underground forces of any of His Majesty's allies in any war, conflict or police action in which Canada was involved.
The Merchant Navy or non-military services in an actual theatre of war in which Canada was involved.
His Majesty's reserve forces including Cadet Instructors on the Cadet Cadre for not less than one year.
The Royal Canadian Mounted Police or The Royal Newfoundland Constabulary for not less than one year.
The forces of a country while that country was a member of NATO or NORAD in alliance with Canada.
The forces of the United States.
The Vietnam War with the Armed Forces of the United States, Australia, New Zealand, the Republic of Korea or South Vietnam, and were a Canadian citizen or Commonwealth subject at the time of service.
The Canadian Coast Guard as an officer or crew member who has two or more years active service on the high seas or inland waterways.
A city, municipal or provincial police force as a police officer for not less than one year.

Associate membership
Individuals who do not qualify for ordinary membership can be associate members if one of the following applies:
The Royal Canadian Air, Army or Sea cadets for no less than 3 years of the joined date.(Cadet graduates may also be eligible for their first year free.)
They are the child, stepchild, adopted child, grandchild, sibling, niece/nephew, widow/er, parent or spouse of someone who is or was eligible for ordinary membership.
They are the child of an associate member.
They have served as a cadet civilian instructor for not less than 3 years.
They have served as an officer in the Navy League of Canada for not less than 2 years.
They have served in the Polish Armed Forces after World War II below the rank of officer.
They have served in a City, Municipal, Volunteer, Un-organized Territories or Federal Fire Service for not less than one year.
They are the spouse, parent or sibling of an associate member who qualified subject to the above criteria.

Affiliate voting membership
Commonwealth subjects who do not qualify for ordinary or associate membership are eligible for affiliate membership.

Affiliate non-voting membership
Non-Commonwealth subjects from an Allied nation who support the aims and objects of The Royal Canadian Legion can apply for affiliate non-voting membership.

Archives 
There is a Royal Canadian Legion fond at Library and Archives Canada. The archival reference number is R2966, former archival reference number MG28-I298. The fond covers the date range 1897 to 1987. It consists of: 

 14.91 meters of textual records.   
 c. 832 audio cassettes (c. 617 h, 30 min).   
 4 audio reels (c. 3 h, 30 min).   
 10 videocassettes (12 h, 35 min, 30 s).   
 310 photographs.   
 10 badges.   
 6 pins.   
 4 medals.   
 1 ribbon.   
 1 drawing.   
 45 microfiche.   
 49 microfilm reels.

Freedoms
The Royal Canadian Legion has received the freedom of several locations throughout its history; these include: (Listed in Chronological Order).

  18 November 1986: Kamloops (Branch 52).
  16 October 2005: Port Moody (Port Moody Branch 119). 
  1 July 2016: Courtenay (Courtenay Branch 17).
  1 July 2016: Bonnyville (Bonnyville Branch 183).
  Unknown: Maple Ridge (Maple Ridge Branch 88).
  Unknown: Armstrong (Armstrong Branch 35).

See also

 American Legion
 Remembrance Day
 South African Legion
 The Royal British Legion

References

External links

 List of Civilian organizations with prefix "Royal" - Heritage Canada.
 List of civilian organizations with the prefix "Royal" prepared by the Department of Canadian Heritage 
 Returned & Services League of Australia
The 5P Legal Services Team provides assistance for veterans completing and submitting application forms and effective representation for veterans appearing at Veterans Review and Appeal Board hearings in Ottawa and Ontario.

1925 establishments in Canada
Canadian veterans' organizations
Community centres in Canada
Military of Canada
Organizations based in Canada with royal patronage